Cerro Toro is a Cretaceous landform of the Magallanes Foreland in the Patagonian region of southeastern Chile. The Cerro Toro is an element of the southern Andes and a product of the Andean orogeny, caused by the subduction of the Nazca Plate beneath the South American Plate. The formation of the Cerro Toro began in the Jurassic. The Cueva del Milodón Natural Monument is situated on the southern flank of Cerro Benítez, a lower hill associated with the formation of Cerro Toro.

See also 

 Eberhard Fjord
 Magallanes Basin
 Silla del Diablo

References

Bibliography 
 C. Michael Hogan (2008) Cueva del Milodon, The Megalithic Portal, ed. A. Burnham
 Stephen M. Hubbard, Brian W. Romans and Stephan A. Graham (2008) Deep-water foreland basin deposits of the Cerro Toro Formation, Magallanes basin, Chile: architectural elements of a sinuous basin axial channel belt, Sedimentology, Mar. 2008
 V.A. Ramos and J. Duncan Keppie (1999) Laurentia-Gondwana Connections Before Pangea, Geological Society of America

Further reading 
 Stephen M. Hubbard and Michael R. Shultz, Deep Burrows in Submarine Fan-Channel Deposits of the Cerro Toro Formation (Cretaceous), Chilean Patagonia: Implications For Firmground Development and Colonization in the Deep Sea, Palaios, pp. 223–232

Geology of Chile
Geology of Patagonia
Toro, Cerro